This List of Japanese Naval ships and war vessels in World War II is a list of seafaring vessels of the Imperial Japanese Navy of World War II. It includes submarines, battleships, oilers, minelayers and other types of Japanese sea vessels of war and naval ships used during wartime.

Aircraft carrier

Heavy/Fleet carriers

Light carriers

Escort carriers

Seaplane tenders

Armoured vessels

Battlecruisers

Battleships

Heavy cruisers

Light cruisers

Destroyers

Destroyers

Torpedo boats

Destroyer escorts (Kaibōkan)

Patrol boats

Submarine chasers

Submarine

Submarine tender

Gunboats

Mine warfare vessels

Auxiliary vessels

Food Supply Ship

Repair ship

Survey ship

See also
Imperial Japanese Navy of World War II
List of Japanese military equipment of World War II
List of ships of the Japanese Navy
List of ships of the Second World War

Navy ships and war vessels